Verona is Czech music group comprising composer and performer Petr Fider and singer Markéta Jakšlová. They began performing together in 2001. Their first album, Náhodou  ("By Chance") was released in 2002. The second single from this album became a hit song in Czech Republic and Slovakia. They have recorded three albums as of 2012. Their music is in the pop and dance genres, with elements of House and Trance. In 2011, they produced an English-language song, "Hey Boy", that charted in several European countries.

Members
 Petr Fider - songwriter, musician
 Veronika Stýblová - singer

Past members
 Markéta Jakšlová - singer

Discography

Singles

Albums
 Náhodou
 Nejsi sám
 Jen Tobě
 Girotondo
 Videokolekce (DVD)

References

External links
 http://www.verona-music.cz/
 Verona band info (cs)
 Verona's fans Facebook page
 Full complete discography

Czech pop music groups
Musical groups established in 2001
2001 establishments in the Czech Republic